Goux may refer to:

People
 Fernand Goux (1899–2008), French soldier
 Jean-Paul Goux (born 1948), French writer
 Jules Goux (1885–1965), French driver
 Luciano Goux (born 1980), Argentinian football player
 Marcelo Goux (born 1975), Argentinian football player

Places
 Goux, Gers, France
 Goux-les-Usiers, Doubs, France
 Goux-lès-Dambelin, Doubs, France
 Goux-sous-Landet, Doubs, France